Secret Story 2011 is the Dutch version of Secret Story, based on the original French version. The show started on February 13, 2011 on NET 5. The host for the Galas is Renate Verbaan and for the Daily Diary is Bart Boonstra. The house is the same one used in the Portuguese version, although it has been redecorated for this version.

There were 15 housemates. The show lasted three months like the French and Portuguese versions, concluded on May 12, 2011 for a total of 91 days.

Housemates

Aafke

I am a professional piercer

Alexander
On Day 7, it was revealed to the public that Alexander is a Knight.

Cynthia
Cynthia was evicted on Day 14 with 20% of the votes to save. After she was evicted, she confirmed her secret was that she had been homeless.

Gerard
During the live show on Day 14, Gerard's secret was revealed to the public as he is a millionaire.

Guido
When Guido and Laura entered the house on Day 1, they were given their secret - they are in a fake relationship.

Joanna
Joanna's secret was revealed on Day 1 - she is a sleepwalker.

Jurien
Jurien was the first housemate to be evicted on Day 7, where he revealed his secret: He used steroids once.

Karim
Karim has been in a Bollywood movie.

Laura
Laura entered the house on Day 1 and was told her secret was to be in a fake relationship with Guido.

Maik
Maik entered the house on day 1 and was the third evicted on day 21. He didn't need to leave the house. Instead, he was held in the Secret Chamber for the weekend whereafter he was allowed to return to the house and continue the game. The only sidenote is he can only keep half the money if he is the winner of Secret Story. Maik's secret is: he underwent a breast reduction.

Monique
Is gifted.

Philip
I had a romance with an Olympic gold winner Femke Heemskerk

Servio

I am a bingo-queen. his nickname was miss windy mills

Sharon

I survived the tsunami

Sofia
Grew up in an orphanage (her parents were inland skippers)

Secrets
Housemates' secrets...

1. I am a millionaire

2. I am a bingo-queen

3. I am a professional piercer

4 / 5. Our relationship is a lie (for two people)

6. I've played in a Bollywood movie

7. I use steroids

8. I grew up in an orphanage

9. I had a romance with an Olympic gold winner

10. I am a Knight

11. I sleepwalk

12. I had a breast reduction

13. I am gifted

14. I survived the tsunami

15. I've been homeless

Secrets unveiled to the public
Kick-Off
Laura & Guido had imposed a new secret. The relationship between Laura and Guido is a lie. Joanna sleepwalking, which she at first told the broadcast room of the truth.

1 Elimination Show
Alex told the House of Truth that he is a knight. Jurien ingested steroids, he tells Renata when he is eliminated.

2 Elimination Show
Veronica Magazine is the premiere online at 16:00 to announce that Gerard millionaire. Cynthia has been temporarily homeless, she says that after she was eliminated.

3 Elimination Show
"The Voice" Karim confronted with the fact that he's played in a Bollywood movie. Maik has had a breast reduction, he says that after he is eliminated.

4 Elimination Show
Monique told the House of Truth that she is gifted. Sofia grew up in a boarding school, she says that after she was eliminated.

5 Elimination Show
Sharon told the House of Truth that they survived the tsunami of 2004.

Nominations

Notes:

 In round one of nominations, only female housemates could nominate and only male housemates could be nominated.
 In round two of nominations, only male housemates could nominate and only female housemates could be nominated.
 In round three of nominations, only female housemates could nominate and only male housemates could be nominated.
 Maik gets a second change of "De Stem", Maik didn't leave the house but came in the Secret room.
 During the fourth round of nominations, Maik was in the Secret room and could not nominate.
 In round four of nominations, only male housemates could nominate and only female housemates could be nominated.
 In round five of nominations, only female housemates could nominate and only male housemates could be nominated.
 In round six of nominations, every housemate could nominate.
 Gerard gets nominated by "De Stem" because he took off the handcuffs in the handcuffs challenge.
 In round seven of nominations, only male housemates could nominate and only female housemates could be nominated.
 In round eight of nominations, every housemate could nominate.
 Alexander gets nominated because Laura failed to complete her challenge.
 In round nine of nominations there was no nomination because the losing team was automatically nominated.
 In round ten of nominations, every housemate could nominate to save, not evict. The housemates with the least support from their fellow housemates were nominated.

Eviction Results
 Week 1: Philip (39%), Gerard: (31%) and Jurien: (30%)
 Week 2: Laura (50%), Aafke: (30%) and Cynthia: (20%)
 Week 3: Alexander: (38%), Servio (35%) and Maik: (27%)
 Week 4: Laura: (49%), Sharon: (29%) and Sofia: (22%)
 Week 5: Philip: (42%), Servio: (51%) and Guido: (49%)
 Week 6: Gerard: (78%) and  Servio: (22%) 
 Week 7: Sharon (40%), Joanna: (38%) and Aafke: (22%)
 Week 8: Karim: (40%), Philip (39%) and Alexander: (21%)
 Week 9: Sharon (36%), Gerard: (35%) and Maik: (29%)
 Week 10: Joanna: (72%) and Laura: (28%)
 Week 11: Joanna: (48%), Karim: (28%) and Gerard: (24%)
 Week 12: Sharon: (51%), Karim: (26%) and Monique: (23%)

Housemates Individual Account Totals
The totals of the housemates individual bank accounts can be increased by passing individual tasks and discovering other housemates secrets. These totals can also be negatively affected by excessive rule breaking and having their (the housemate) secret discovered/revealing their secret.

External links
 Official website 

2011 Dutch television seasons
Secret Story (franchise)
Netherlands
Net5 original programming